Miguel Muñiz de las Cuevas (22 April 1939 – 10 January 2022) was a Spanish economist and government official. A member of the Spanish Socialist Workers' Party, he served as president of the Official Credit Institute from 1986 to 1995 and directed the Teatro Real from 2004 to 2012. He died in Madrid on 10 January 2022, at the age of 82.

References

1939 births
2022 deaths
Spanish economists
Spanish Socialist Workers' Party politicians
Academic staff of the Autonomous University of Madrid
People from Ourense